Maija Karoliina Saari (born 26 March 1986) is a Finnish international footballer who plays as a defender. She previously represented AIK, Mallbackens IF and Umeå IK in Sweden, Kolbotn, Stabæk Fotball Kvinner, and Vålerenga in the Norwegian Toppserien and FC Honka and HPK in her home country. Since making her debut for the Finland women's national football team in 2007, Saari has won over 85 caps and captained the team.

Club career

A strong, left-sided defender, Saari won three consecutive domestic titles with FC Honka in 2006, 2007 and 2008. She joined the club aged 10 after moving to Helsinki from her birthplace of Vaasa and rose to captain the club. In December 2008 Saari signed a two-year contract with Swedish club Umeå IK. In 2011, she played for Kolbotn Fotball in the Norwegian Toppserien, before returning to Sweden with AIK.

Saari returned to AIK for the 2014 season, having spent 2013 with Mallbackens IF. In December 2015 she agreed a return to Norway, signing a two-year deal with Stabæk Fotball Kvinner.

International career

She made her debut for the senior Finland team on 7 March 2007; playing 90 minutes against Sweden in the Algarve Cup. Saari also played in all four of Finland's matches at UEFA Women's Euro 2009, including the quarter final defeat to England.

In June 2013 Saari, by then the national team captain, was devastated to be ruled out of UEFA Women's Euro 2013 with a cruciate ligament injury.

International goals

References

External links

 

1986 births
Living people
Expatriate women's footballers in Sweden
Expatriate women's footballers in Norway
Finnish women's footballers
Finnish expatriate footballers
Finland women's international footballers
Sportspeople from Vaasa
Damallsvenskan players
Umeå IK players
AIK Fotboll (women) players
Mallbackens IF players
Toppserien players
Kolbotn Fotball players
Kansallinen Liiga players
FC Honka (women) players
Finnish expatriate sportspeople in Norway
Stabæk Fotball Kvinner players
FC Kiisto players
Women's association football defenders